Blizzard is the name of different fictional characters appearing in American comic books published by Marvel Comics. The character is usually depicted as a member of Iron Man's rogues gallery.

The Donnie Gill incarnation has had the most appearances, appearing in several forms of animated media and video games as well as a live-action incarnation in the Marvel Cinematic Universe TV series Agents of S.H.I.E.L.D., portrayed by Dylan Minnette, though the Gregor Shapanka and Randy Macklin incarnations have also appeared in animation.

Publication history
Created by Stan Lee and Don Heck, the Gregor Shapanka version of Blizzard appeared as Jack Frost in Tales of Suspense #45 (Sept. 1963), and as Blizzard beginning in Iron Man #86 (May 1976). He was killed off in The Amazing Spider-Man Annual #20 (Nov. 1986).

The Donnie Gill Blizzard first appeared in Iron Man #223 (Oct. 1987) and was created by David Michelinie and Bob Layton.

The Randy Macklin version of Blizzard first appeared in the Marvel Holiday Special #2 (Jan. 1993) and was created by Sholly Fisch and Tom Morgan.

Fictional character biographies

Gregor Shapanka

Gregor Shapanka is a Hungarian scientist obsessed with immortality, and decides that the study of cryonics is the first step towards his goal. Shapanka takes a job at Stark Industries to fund his research and attempts to steal directly from Tony Stark. After being caught and fired by Tony Stark for trying to steal from Tony Stark's secret vault, Gregor creates a suit containing cold-generating devices and is dubbed by the newspapers as "Jack Frost." He attempts to raid Stark Industries where he captures Pepper Potts and Happy Hogan, but is defeated by Iron Man.

Several years later, Gregor Shapanka escaped prison and attacked Stark's Long Island industrial complex using a new far more powerful cold-generating battle suit and calling himself Blizzard. This time, Blizzard was out to steal Stark's climatron device which could be used to alter weather patterns. Blizzard nearly froze Iron Man to death, but Iron Man was rescued by Potts. Iron Man caused Blizzard's battle suit to short-circuit and then captured him.

Gregor Shapanka obtained financing for recreating his cold-generating costume from multimillionaire Justin Hammer. Blizzard formed a partnership with two other clients of Hammer known as Blacklash and the Melter. Together, the three criminals attacked a hotel casino in Atlantic City, only to be defeated by Iron Man and private bodyguard Bethany Cabe.

Shortly thereafter, Shapanka reconstructs his cold suit in prison. When Electro uses his electrical powers to break out of the adjoining cell, Shapanka is caught in the blast and the suit is fused to his body. Electro and Blizzard then join forces to take over the Daily Bugle, but are stopped by Spider-Man and Daredevil.

Some months later during the "Demon in a Bottle" storyline, Justin Hammer hires Blizzard to join an army of supervillains and battle Iron Man.

Blizzard's body somehow gained the ability to generate intense cold without artificial means. Feeling alienated from humanity, Shapanka (again calling himself Jack Frost) went to live in an ice palace he created within a mountain. The Hulk found Jack Frost's new home and destroyed the ice palace. Jack Frost was seemingly killed in the collapse of his ice domain.

Gregor Shapanka reappeared in the guise of Blizzard. Somehow, Blizzard had lost his bodily power to generate cold and once again needed his battle suit to create low temperatures. Shapanka returned to crime and formed a gang to aid him. However, upon robbing a bank in New York City, Blizzard and his henchmen were found and defeated by Spider-Man and were taken into police custody. Thanks to his lawyer, Blizzard was soon back at large and kidnapped Bobby Saunders (a boy whom he saw speaking with Spider-Man). Through Saunders, Blizzard intended to get revenge for his most recent defeat. Blizzard mistakes a villainous version of Iron Man from the year 2020 for the modern Iron Man and attempts to ambush him. The future Iron Man however is on an urgent mission to find Bobby Saunders (who would grow up to be a terrorist in 2020) and instantly kills Blizzard with a repulsor blast.

Donald Gill

Born in Delaware, Donald "Donnie" Gill was a professional criminal hired by Justin Hammer (who gave him a cryogenic suit resembling the original Blizzard's suit). Since Blizzard was vaporized by Iron Man 2020, Donnie adopted the name. His first mission involved working with the Beetle and Blacklash to capture Force, who had betrayed Hammer. However, Blizzard was clumsy and annoyed his teammates with his amateurish mistakes (such as creating an ice wall blocking the path to their objective). After encasing Blacklash in ice, the trio fled as reinforcements arrived to protect Force.

The trio again tried to capture Force, who was protected by Iron Man. Although Blizzard fought better, when Force entered the fight, he neutralized the villains' powers. Blizzard, the Beetle, and Blacklash split up, fled and rested until their powers returned. Force found Blizzard, whose powers were ineffective against him, so Blizzard fought him with bare hands. Force repelled him, blasting him through a wall. Blizzard doggedly tried to blast Force again (despite warnings), and was electrocuted. The Beetle and Blacklash abandoned Blizzard; Chemistro blamed them for their failures, and they were arrested.

Before Blizzard could be jailed, he was rescued by the Rhino for Hammer. His loyalty to Hammer increased, although Iron Man tried to mentor him. Hammer negotiated with Iron Man for Blizzard, forcing the latter to help him take down the Ghost. Iron Man agreed, but Blizzard refused to believe that Hammer betrayed him. After hearing a recording, Blizzard was crushed; he surrendered to Iron Man, and was saved by Chemistro and the Melter.

After solo missions against the Avengers and the New Warriors, attending the A.I.M. Weapons Expo with several other supervillains and joining the largest group of the Masters of Evil, Blizzard worked with a smaller team (including villains the Constrictor, Crossfire and the daughters of the Tarantula and Batroc the Leaper). Their mission failed after interference from Agent X and his allies.

Blizzard attacked the She-Hulk in a bar; instead of defeating him, she invited him for a drink. Drunk, he contemplated his lack of recognition. Before collapsing in a stupor, Blizzard noted that he liked the She-Hulk. After reverting to her Jennifer Walters persona she collapsed, vomiting, on top of him.

With the Avengers disbanded, the Beetle (now known as MACH-IV) decided to form a new group of Thunderbolts. Like the original Thunderbolts, they were former villains seeking redemption for their crimes as superheroes. Gill was one of the first members invited to join by MACH-IV, and he agreed. However, he lacked confidence despite his desire to help people. As a Thunderbolt, Blizzard fought several enemies, including Fathom Five, the Wrecking Crew, and the Purple Man.

Blizzard and fellow Thunderbolt the Speed Demon became close friends. When the Speed Demon tried to commit crimes with the Shocker, Blizzard convinced him to use his former Whizzer outfit and a tracking device. Angry with Blizzard, the Speed Demon tied him upside-down and naked on a bridge. Although doubting his status as a superhero and feeling hopeless, Blizzard gained strength from the others (especially Songbird, who insulted him and dismissed him from the group when she became its leader).

Baron Zemo, forming a group to fight Songbird's Thunderbolts, recruited Blizzard (who spent his days in bars after his firing by Songbird). His new teammate, the Fixer, enhanced Blizzard's abilities. He battled the Thunderbolts; the groups were soon assimilated, and Blizzard helped them against the U-Foes during the Civil War. Against the Overmind, Blizzard proved himself to his teammates by shielding them (and Songbird).

In the final battle against the Grandmaster, Blizzard's suit was destroyed after the Wellspring energy was released and he was pardoned for his past crimes. Blizzard later appeared as an inmate at the Raft.

Blizzard later aligns himself with Iron Man, Zeke Stane, Whirlwind, and the Living Laser against the Mandarin but is defeated by the Mandarin's forces.

During the "Infinity" storyline, Blizzard was seen with Whirlwind robbing banks when they are approached by the Spymaster. Blizzard and Whirlwind are recruited by the Spymaster to join him and his villain allies (consisting of the Constrictor, Firebrand IV, the Titanium Man, the Unicorn, and Whiplash IV) in a plot to attack the almost-defenseless Stark Tower. During the briefing, Blizzard suddenly collapses. When Blizzard regains consciousness, he discovers that his skin has turned white. Blizzard had been exposed to the Terrigen Mists unleashed upon the face of the entire Earth by Black Bolt. Being unknowingly an Inhuman descendant, Blizzard experienced Terrigenesis, which causes the manifestation of his latent powers. Blizzard thought that this was his opportunity to "be part of something bigger" and decided to leave the Spymaster's team. However, he and Whirlwind were brutally attacked by the Spymaster and the Titanium Man when they tried to leave. Blizzard and Whirlwind were forced into taking part of the assault to Stark Tower. After the Spymaster used teleporter discs to teleport some Iron Man armors to the buyers, he escaped and left Blizzard and the rest of his accomplices to be discovered by the heroes, which were using the tower as a base. They managed to defeat the heroes, and they were offered to be taken to the Spymaster by the Titanium Man. When they arrived to a spaceship where the Spymaster was, they were ambushed by him and the Titanium Man, who revealed himself as Captain Atlas of the Kree (who were the masterminds behind the heist). Blizzard and the other villains managed to escape custody and started fighting the Spymaster, the Titanium Man and the army of Iron Men (controlled by the Spymaster). The actual Iron Man arrived to the spaceship, after having tracked down the armors, and helped Blizzard and his allies defeat the enemies. During the fight, Blizzard used the powers he discovered of being like a human battery to overcharge the armors and deactivate them, but he fainted and fell off the spaceship's cargo door. A suit Iron Man was controlling rescued him, but in order to let his friends escape, Blizzard froze himself and the suit. Blizzard was taken to S.H.I.E.L.D. custody and was left under the simulation he had been delivered to the Inhumans in order to prove himself as the changed man Blizzard thought he was....until S.H.I.E.L.D. could know what to do with him.

The Assassins Guild hired Blizzard to target Elektra. He fought Elektra in the Arctic and was defeated.

During the "Avengers: Standoff!" storyline, Blizzard was shown to be incarcerated at Pleasant Hill which is a S.H.I.E.L.D. prison disguised as a gated community where the inmates are transformed into model citizens using the powers of Kobik.

Blizzard later accompanied Korvac, Controller, and Unicorn in fighting Iron Man and Hellcat. During this time, he was seen wearing one of Gregor Shapanka's old costumes.

Mickey Quaid
At the time when Donnie Gill was unavailable, Justin Hammer had a man named Mickey Quaid become a substitute Blizzard in order to assist Afterburner, Beetle, Blacklash, Boomerang, and Spymaster in fighting Silver Sable and the Wild Pack.

Randy Macklin

Randall "Randy" Macklin, an ex-criminal, fails to find work following his release from prison and uses a spare Blizzard costume he was safeguarding for his friend Donnie Gill. Macklin, however, is quickly defeated by Iron Man, who offers him a legitimate job at Stark Enterprises.

Jim

A man named Jim became the fourth Blizzard upon being granted cryokinesis by the Mandarin and Zeke Stane as part of their plans to revamp and upgrade the different enemies of Iron Man. His first mission is to freeze desalinization plants in Abu Dhabi, where it would leave the country with no water. It was revealed that the Mandarin had a bomb placed in Jim's neck to ensure his compliance.

When Iron Man tries to persuade his enemies to turn against the Mandarin, Blizzard heeded the call as Iron Man deactivated the bombs on them. Blizzard aligns himself with Iron Man, Zeke Stane, Whirlwind, and the Living Laser against the Mandarin and his Titanomechs. During the battle, Blizzard is impaled by a Titanomech.

Powers and abilities 
All the Blizzards have similar powers, derived from their costumes. Micro-circuited cryogenic units make it possible to emit freezing rays, which lower the temperature of the surrounding air (or objects) and release ice as projectiles.

Donnie Gill's costume is upgraded by supervillains the Beetle and the Fixer. This enables even greater manipulation of cold, where Gill can encase people in snow and ice, create an ice barricade or generate "ice sleds" for transport. Following his Terrigenesis, Blizzard also developed electricity manipulation, where he can manipulate electrical currents and charge the energies in his body.

Other versions

Earth-X 
In the Earth-X reality, the Donnie Gill version of Blizzard has the same history. He was killed by Norman Osborn prior to the Green Goblin's rise to power.

House of M: Masters of Evil 
In the House of M reality, the Donnie Gill version of Blizzard appears as a member of Hood's Masters of Evil.

Power Pack 
The Donnie Gill version of Blizzard appears in Iron Man & Power Pack issue #2 with Speed Demon. He kidnaps Irena Crumb (daughter of millionaire Arnold Crumb, and a school rival of Julie Power's) from her school and takes her to an abandoned warehouse across town, where he tortures her. Speed Demon runs in, telling him that Power Pack has found them; Power Pack bursts in, and a fight ensues. At one point, Blizzard freezes the ground, causing Speed Demon to slip and smash into him. The Pack captures Blizzard, and Lightspeed takes his mask so she can rescue Irena from Speed Demon incognito. Afterwards, Blizzard and Speed Demon are arrested.

In other media

Television 
 Gregor Shapanka / Jack Frost appears in the "Iron Man" segment of The Marvel Super Heroes, voiced by Chris Wiggins.
 The Donnie Gill incarnation of Blizzard appears in Iron Man, primarily voiced by Chuck McCann, though Neil Ross voiced him in the episode "The Beast Within". This version is a servant of the Mandarin and received a suit of exo-armor that appeared occasionally throughout the series.
 The Donnie Gill incarnation of Blizzard appears in Iron Man: Armored Adventures, voiced by David Orth. This version is a cryogenics scientist and former employee of Stark Industries CEO Obadiah Stane who was left scarred and vowed revenge. Additionally, Gill wears a technological suit equipped with a freezing ray attached to his right arm. Throughout season one, Gill attempts to exact revenge against Stane twice, only to be foiled by Iron Man each time. In season two, Gill is hired by Justin Hammer to kill Iron Man. Following a string of failures, Gill is said to have been killed by Titanium Man on Hammer's orders.
 The Donnie Gill incarnation of Blizzard appears in The Avengers: Earth's Mightiest Heroes, voiced by Troy Baker. In the episode "Breakout, Part 1", he escapes from the Vault and fights Iron Man. In the episode "The Man Who Stole Tomorrow", Gill is apprehended by the Avengers and remanded to Prison 42. In the episode "Assault on 42", Gill joins forces with the Avengers and his fellow inmates to fight Annihilus and his Annihilation Wave, only to be killed in the ensuing battle.
 The Donnie Gill incarnation of Blizzard makes non-speaking appearances in Ultimate Spider-Man.
 Donnie Gill appears in the Marvel Cinematic Universe series Agents of S.H.I.E.L.D., portrayed by Dylan Minnette. This version is a cadet at S.H.I.E.L.D. Academy. Introduced in the episode "Seeds", he and his friend Seth Dormer build a weather device to impress industrialist, Ian Quinn. However, the device causes a super-storm that kills Dormer. Gill is taken into S.H.I.E.L.D.'s custody, but develops cryokinetic powers. As of the episode "Making Friends and Influencing People", Gill perfected his powers while he was incarcerated and unknowingly brainwashed by Hydra before escaping during their attempted takeover of S.H.I.E.L.D. and killing several Hydra agents. An undercover Jemma Simmons tries to apprehend him, but her superior Sunil Bakshi uses a post-hypnotic trigger phrase to reactivate Gill's mind-control. Gill is sniped by Skye and lost in the ocean, though his body is never recovered.
 The Donnie Gill incarnation of Blizzard appears in Marvel Disk Wars: The Avengers, voiced by Hideo Ishikawa in Japanese and Patrick Seitz in English.
 The Randy Macklin incarnation of Blizzard appears in the Spider-Man episode "Spider-Man on Ice", voiced by Trevor Devall. This version is initially a low-level henchman of Hammerhead's before acquiring a cryogenic gauntlet from Harry Osborn. Despite being slowly mutated by the gauntlet, Macklin dubs himself the Blizzard, attacks Hammerhead's gang, and attempts to freeze Manhattan. However, Spider-Man acquires thermal technology from Harry and disarms Macklin before leaving him for the police.
 The Donnie Gill incarnation of Blizzard appears in the Marvel Future Avengers episode "The Mystery Mist", voiced again by Hideo Ishikawa in Japanese and voiced by Kyle McCarley in English.

Video games 
 The Donnie Gill incarnation of Blizzard appears as a boss in The Invincible Iron Man.
 The Donnie Gill incarnation of Blizzard appears as a boss and playable character in Marvel: Avengers Alliance.
 The Donnie Gill incarnation of Blizzard appears in Marvel Heroes, voiced by Michael Benyaer.

Notes

References 

Articles about multiple fictional characters
Characters created by David Michelinie
Characters created by Don Heck
Characters created by Stan Lee
Comics characters introduced in 1963
Comics characters introduced in 1976
Comics characters introduced in 1987
Comics characters introduced in 1994
Fictional characters from Delaware
Fictional characters with electric or magnetic abilities
Fictional characters with ice or cold abilities
Fictional Hungarian people
Fictional mercenaries in comics
Inhumans
Marvel Comics male supervillains
Marvel Comics scientists
Marvel Comics supervillains
Marvel Comics television characters